Biliatresone is an example of a very rare type of a naturally occurring isoflavonoid-related 1,2-diaryl-2-propenone found in Dysphania glomulifera and D. littoralis. It has been found to cause extrahepatic biliary atresia in a zebrafish model. The enone moiety of biliatresone is particularly reactive, being enhanced by the methylenedioxy, methoxy and hydroxy groups, and undergoes ready Michael addition of water and methanol.

References

Benzodioxoles
Phenols
Methoxy compounds
Ketones